The year 1893 in art involved some significant events.

Events

 February – Grafton Galleries open in London.
 April – The Studio: An Illustrated Magazine of Fine and Applied Art is first published in London by Charles Holme with Joseph Gleeson White as editor and a cover design by Aubrey Beardsley.
 May 1 – The 1893 World's Fair, also known as the World's Columbian Exposition, opens to the public in Chicago, USA, with a Romanesque statue of Columbia overlooking the man-made lake. The first United States commemorative postage stamps are issued for the Exposition. Among other art exhibits are two bronze calves by Anne Marie Carl-Nielsen.
 June 14 – Opening of Shelley Memorial at University College, Oxford, designed by Basil Champneys with a reclining nude marble statue of Percy Bysshe Shelley by Edward Onslow Ford.
 June 29 – Unveiling of the Shaftesbury Memorial Fountain at Piccadilly Circus in London, with a gilded aluminium statue of Anteros, designed by Alfred Gilbert and cast by Morris Singer.
 Ford Madox Brown completes painting The Manchester Murals in Manchester Town Hall (England).
 The National Sculpture Society is founded in the United States.
 Alois Riegl's Stilfragen: Grundlegungen zu einer Geschichte der Ornamentik is published in Berlin.
 Henri Rousseau gives up his job as a Paris toll collector and moves to a studio in Montparnasse where he lives and paints full-time.
 A 16th century Ardabil Carpet from Persia enters the collection of the South Kensington Museum in London.

Exhibitions
 December – Unter den Linden in Berlin holds an exhibition of Edvard Munch's work, including six paintings entitled Study for a Series: Love, beginning his Frieze of Life cycle.

Works

 Lawrence Alma-Tadema – Unconscious Rivals
 Léon Bakst – Self-portrait
 Charles Burton Barber – A Special Pleader
 Aubrey Beardsley – Illustrations to Malory's Le Morte d'Arthur (J. M. Dent)
 Henrique Bernardelli – Messalini
 Olga Boznańska – Self-portrait
 Edgar Bundy – Antonio Stradivari at work in his studio
 Mary Cassatt – The Child's Bath
 Paul Cézanne – Basket of Apples
 Henri-Edmond Cross – The Evening Air (approximate date)
 Ernesto de la Cárcova – Without Bread or Work
 Frank Dicksee – The Funeral of a Viking
 Albert Edelfelt
 Larin Paraske
 Two women with laundry
 Paul Gauguin
Otahi
Portrait of the artist in a hat
 J. W. Godward
 A Priestess (nude version)
 Reflections
 Yes Or No
 Félix Resurrección Hidalgo – Adios del Sol
 Winslow Homer – The Fox Hunt
 Paul Jamin – Brennus and His Share of the Spoils
 Eero Järnefelt
 Larin Paraske
 Under the Yoke (Burning the Brushwood) (Raatajat rahanalaiset)

 Christian Krohg – Leiv Eirikson Discovering America
 Peder Severin Krøyer – Summer Evening on Skagen's Southern Beach (Sommeraften på Skagen Sønderstrand med Anna Ancher og Marie Krøyer)
 Gaston La Touche – L'Ennui
 Princess Louise, Marchioness of Lorne – Statue of her mother Queen Victoria, in Kensington Gardens, London
 Hendrik Willem Mesdag – Bomschuiten in the surf, ready for departure
 Albert Joseph Moore
 An Idyll
 The Loves of the Winds and the Seasons
 Edvard Munch
 Death in the Sickroom
 The Scream
 Starry Night
 Władysław Podkowiński – Frenzy of Exultations
 Odilon Redon – Sita (pastel)
 Augustus Saint-Gaudens – Diana (bronze cast)
 Alfred Stieglitz – photographs
 The Terminal
 Winter – Fifth Avenue
 Franz Stuck – The Sin
 Joseph-Noël Sylvestre – François Rude working on the Arc de Triomphe
 Abbott Handerson Thayer – The Virgin
 Henri de Toulouse-Lautrec – Jane Avril (poster)
 Henry Scott Tuke – August Blue
 Raja Ravi Varma – There Comes Papa
 Stanisław Wyspiański – Self-portrait

Births

January to June
 January 13 – Chaïm Soutine, painter (died 1943)
 February 2 – Sreten Stojanović, Serbian sculptor (died 1960).
 February 10 – Walter Hofer, German art dealer (died c. 1971)
 March 3
 Ivon Hitchens, English painter (died 1979)
 Beatrice Wood, American artist and ceramicist (died 1998)
 March 11 – Wanda Gag, children's author and artist (died 1946)
 March 22 – Bernard Fleetwood-Walker, English artist (died 1965)
 March 29 – Dora Carrington, painter and designer (died 1932)
 April 9 – Charles E. Burchfield, American scene painter (died 1967)
 April 11 – John Nash, English painter, illustrator, and engraver (died 1978)
 April 20 – Joan Miró, Spanish painter, sculptor and ceramicist (died 1983)
 May 16 – Stella Bowen, Australian painter (died 1947)
 May 31 – Janet Sobel, born Jennie Olechovsky, Ukrainian-born American Abstract Expressionist pioneer of drip painting (died 1968)

July to December
 July 3 – Sándor Bortnyik, Hungarian painter and graphic designer (died 1976)
 July 8 – Abraham Rattner, American painter and camouflage specialist (died 1978)
 July 26 – George Grosz, German painter and draftsman (died 1959)
 September 2 – Mary Cecil Allen, Australian-born painter (died 1962)
 September 15 – Rene Paul Chambellan, American sculptor (died 1955)
 October 1 – Marianne Brandt, German painter, sculptor and designer (died 1983)
 October 8 – Orovida Camille Pissarro, English painter and etcher (died 1968)
 October 9 – Mário de Andrade, Brazilian writer and photographer (died 1945)
 November 19 – Conrad O'Brien-ffrench, British intelligence officer, mountaineer and painter (died 1986)
 December – Eugène Gabritschevsky, Russian biologist and artist (died 1979)
 December 10 – Russell Johnson, American cartoonist (died 1995)
 December 29 – Berthold Bartosch, Bohemian animator (died 1968)

Date unknown
 Otto Eppers, American cartoonist (died 1955)
 Henry Matthew Talintyre, British comic strip artist (died 1962)

Deaths
 January 30 – Prince Grigory Gagarin, Russian soldier and painter (born 1811)
 February 21 – John Pettie, Scottish-born painter (born 1839)
 March 16 – William H. Illingworth, American photographer (born 1844)
 April 6 – George Vicat Cole, English painter (born 1833)
 April 18 – Anna Bilińska-Bohdanowicz, Polish painter (born 1857)
 May 8 – Adèle Kindt, Belgian portrait and genre painter (born 1804)
 August 10 – Robert Cornelius, American pioneer of photography (born 1809)
 September 25 – Albert Joseph Moore, English painter (born 1841)
 September 28 – Annie Feray Mutrie, British painter (born 1826)
 October 6 – Ford Madox Brown, French-born English painter (born 1821)
 October 10 – Barthélemy Menn, Swiss plein air painter and draughtsman (born 1811)
 October 29 – Gustav Mützel, German animal painter (born 1839)
 December 10 – Josephine Calamatta, French painter and engraver (born 1817)
 December 23 – Gunnar Berg, Norwegian painter (born 1863)

References

 
Years of the 19th century in art
1890s in art